Hardiness of plants describes their ability to survive adverse growing conditions. It is usually limited to discussions of climatic adversity. Thus a plant's ability to tolerate cold, heat, drought, flooding, or wind are typically considered measurements of hardiness. Hardiness of plants is defined by their native extent's geographic location: longitude, latitude and elevation. These attributes are often simplified to a hardiness zone. In temperate latitudes, the term most often describes resistance to cold, or "cold-hardiness", and is generally measured by the lowest temperature a plant can withstand. 

Hardiness of a plant is usually divided into two categories: tender, and hardy. (Some sources also use the erroneous terms "Half-hardy" or "Fully hardy".) Tender plants are those killed by freezing temperatures, while hardy plants survive freezing—at least down to certain temperatures, depending on the plant. "Half-hardy" is a term used sometimes in horticulture to describe bedding plants which are sown in heat in winter or early spring, and planted outside after all danger of frost has passed. "Fully hardy" usually refers to plants being classified under the Royal Horticultural Society classifications, and can often cause confusion to those not using this method.

Plants vary greatly in their tolerance of growing conditions, and are capable of adaptation to changes in climate on their own to some extent. The selective breeding of varieties capable of withstanding particular climates forms an important part of agriculture and horticulture. Part of the work of nursery growers of plants consists of cold hardening, or hardening off their plants, to prepare them for likely conditions in later life.

Winter hardiness
Winter-hardy plants grow during the winter, or at least remain healthy and dormant. Apart from hardy evergreens, these include many cultivated plants, including varieties of cabbage and broccoli, and all kinds of carrot. Some bulbs – such as tulips – need cold winters to bloom, while others – such as freesia – can survive a freezing winter.  Many domestic plants are assigned a hardiness zone that specifies the climates in which they can survive. Winter gardens are dependent upon the cultivation of winter-hardy plants.

Mechanisms
Woody plants survive freezing temperatures by suppressing the formation of ice in living cells or by allowing water to freeze in plant parts that are not affected by ice formation. The common mechanism for woody plants to survive down to –40 °C (–40 °F) is supercooling. Woody plants that survive lower temperatures are dehydrating their cells, allowing water to freeze between cell walls and the cells to survive. Plants normally considered hardy may not survive freezing if they are not readily acclimated, which renders them unable to use these mechanisms.

Hardiness ratings

Various hardiness ratings are published. In the United States (US), the most widely used is the U.S. Department of Agriculture (USDA) system of hardiness zones based on average minimum yearly temperatures. This system was developed specifically for the extremely diverse range of conditions in the US, from baking desert to frozen tundra. Another commonly used system is the Sunset Climate Zone system. This system is much more specific to climates (i.e. precipitation, temperature, and humidity based) and less dependent on the yearly minimum.

In contrast the United Kingdom (UK) and Western Europe have an oceanic climate, and experience a narrower range of temperatures that is tempered by the presence of the Gulf Stream. This results in areas like western Scotland experiencing relatively mild winter conditions and cool summers that enable the growing of some subtropical plants, despite being well to the north of subtropical climate areas. The Royal Horticultural Society has published a set of hardiness ratings applicable to the UK. The ratings range from H1a to H7. Most outdoor plants in the UK fall within the range H4,  (hardy in the average winter) to H5,  (hardy in a cold winter). Also, the average minimum temperature in the UK is much warmer than the average minimums in much of the northern US, while the average maximums in the northern US are often much warmer in summer than the UK.

In addition to cold tolerance, plant hardiness has been observed to be linked to how much stress specific plants are undergoing into the winter, or even how fast the onset of cold weather is in a specific year.  This means that often stressed plants will exhibit less cold tolerance than plants that have been well maintained.  Plants may also die if the winter changes from balmy to exceptionally cold in a short period of time.

Other hardiness 
Tolerance to other climatic factors are often omitted from the "hardiness" discussion. This section provides a very brief overview of the topics.
 Heat tolerance may be displayed alongside cold-hardiness, such as in the American Horticultural Society's "Heat Zones". See  and Breeding for heat stress tolerance.
 For drought tolerance, see  and Breeding for drought stress tolerance.
 For flood tolerance, see cited review.
 The mechanisms of wind tolerance are still poorly understood. Wind not only causes mechanical stress, but also makes the plant colder and dryer. Plants may evolutionally adapt to wind by becoming smaller (to avoid wind) or bigger (to resist the wind). Physiologically, the mechanical force also causes a cascade of signals in the living plant.

See also
Microclimate

References

Bibliography

External links

Interactive Version of the 1990 USDA Hardiness Zone Map

Plants by adaptation
Agricultural terminology
Crops
Garden plants
Horticulture
Plant ecology
Trees by climate
Climate zones